The Hungarian University of Agriculture and Life Sciences is a university of technology in Hungary. Its headquarters and main campus are located about 30 kilometres from the capital, Budapest, in the Central Hungarian town of Gödöllő. Other campuses are based in Budapest, Békéscsaba, Gyula, Jászberény, and Szarvas. The University consists of eight different faculties for study and research, and enrolls approximately 15,000 students.

The university was established in 2000 from the merge of several previously independent institutions - the oldest of these being the former University of Veterinary Medicine Budapest, founded in 1787. (Note: In 2016, the University of Veterinary Medicine Budapest regained its independence thus it is no longer part of the SZIU.) The Szent István University is named after Hungarian King Stephen I (the Saint). The current rector of the university is Dr. János Tőzsér.

Change of structure 
On the 1st of February the unuiversity structure changed. The new name
Hungarian University of Agriculture and Life Sciences
There are no facutiy exists at all

The structure consists of 
Campuses 
Budai Campus (Budapest); 
Georgikon (Keszthely); 
Szent István (Gödöllő); 
Károly Róbert (Gyöngyös); 
Kaposvár
Institutes

Faculties before 2021  
 Faculty of Agricultural and Environmental Sciences
 Faculty of Agricultural and Economics Studies
 Faculty of Economics and Social Sciences
 Faculty of Food Science
 Faculty of Horticultural Science
 Faculty of Landscape Architecture and Urbanism
 Faculty of Mechanical Engineering
 Ybl Miklós Faculty of Architecture and Civil Engineering

References 

2000 establishments in Hungary
Educational institutions established in 2000
Gödöllő
Universities and colleges in Hungary
Universities and colleges formed by merger in Hungary